Pierre Colombier (1896–1958) was a French screenwriter and film director.

Selected filmography
Director
 The Marriage of Rosine (1926)
 His Best Client (1932)
 Charlemagne (1933)
 School for Coquettes (1935)
 La Marraine de Charley (1935) (Charley's Aunt)
 The King (1936)
 The Club of Aristocrats (1937)
 The Kings of Sport (1937)
 Tricoche and Cacolet (1938)
 Latin Quarter (1939)

References

External links
 

1896 births
1958 deaths
French film directors
French male screenwriters
20th-century French screenwriters
People from Compiègne
20th-century French male writers